Lattu is a surname. Notable people with the surname include:

Matti Lattu (born 1971), Finnish judoka
Pete Lattu (born 1979), Finnish actor

See also
Meanings of minor planet names: 30001–31000#775

Finnish-language surnames